Revenge of the Nerds IV: Nerds in Love is a 1994 American made-for-television comedy film, a sequel to the 1984 film Revenge of the Nerds, and the final installment in the Revenge of the Nerds series.

Plot
Dudley "Booger" Dawson (Curtis Armstrong) is marrying his Omega Mu girlfriend Jeannie (Corinne Bohrer), but her wealthy father Aaron tries to stop them, as his desire to maintain his conservative, nouveau riche standing clashes with his daughter's common interests with and love for the nerdy Booger. Jeannie's father works with his loathsome son-in-law Chip (the husband of Jeannie's older sister Gaylord) to find a way to discredit Booger and cause Jeannie to call off the wedding. Lewis Skolnick and the other nerds discover the conspiracy and work to save Booger's wedding ceremony from being ruined. In a subplot, Lewis' wife Betty is pregnant with their first child and is in her third trimester as the wedding date approaches.

Booger fights an accusation that he fathered an illegitimate child, Heidi, who is introduced as "Heidi Dawson" by Chip. Jeannie's mother tells her husband that she will leave him if he does not support his daughter's wedding to Booger, and Chip's accusations fall apart when the little girl reveals she was taken from an orphanage to play the illegitimate child role. Chip's wife decides to divorce him and throw him out of their lives forever, leaving Chip to swear his own revenge against the nerds (while Gaylord declares to cheers that her next husband will be a nerd). Aaron apologizes to Booger and gives his daughter his blessing, stating as well that he is proud to be nouveau riche and the California GOP will have to accept him that way or else. Booger and Jeannie are married, Betty gives birth to a healthy baby boy, and the newly married couple tell Heidi they would like to adopt her.

Cast
Curtis Armstrong as Dudley (Booger) Dawson
Corinne Bohrer as Jeanie Humphrey-Dawson
Joseph Bologna as Aaron Humphrey
Robert Carradine as Lewis Skolnick
Julia Montgomery as Betty Childs-Skolnick
Christina Pickles as Tippy
Jessica Tuck as Gaylord Medford
Robert Picardo as Chad Penrod
Stephen Davies as Chip Medford
Laurel Moglen as Judy
Larry B. Scott as Lamar Latrelle
Brian Tochi as Takashi Toshiro
Ted McGinley as Stanley Harvey "Stan" Gable
James Cromwell as Mr. Skolnick
Donald Gibb as Frederick Aloysius "Ogre" Palowaski
Bernie Casey as U. N. Jefferson
John Pinette as Trevor Gulf
Gregg Binkley as Harold
Marvin Kaplan as Mr. Dawson
James Karen as Mylan Whitfield

Note: Lewis' best friend, Gilbert did not appear in this film, but is briefly mentioned by Booger. Wormser doesn't appear in the film either.

Promotion
The film was broadcast as part of the Monday night "Fox-o-Rama" promotion. As a promotional gimmick, Fox telecast the film in 3-D and "aroma-vision", the latter of which utilized a series of scratch and sniff cards sold at 7-Eleven outlets, each to be used at certain points during the movie. A prompt appeared at the bottom right-hand corner of the screen to let viewers know when to smell their cards and which card to sniff. Several other network shows employed similar gimmicks with aromatic cards and 3D glasses at around the same time, including Living Single and Married... with Children. The 3D effects used in these broadcasts was based on the Pulfrich effect.

Reception
Todd Everett of Variety had a subdued reaction to the film. He said it was "capably directed" and that the 3-D and "aroma-vision" effects were "OK", and praised several of the actors' performances, but criticized the script as being typical made-for-TV filler, and said that overall the Nerd series was wearing thin.

References

External links
 
 

1990s American films
1994 comedy films
1994 films
1994 television films
20th Century Fox Television films
American comedy television films
Films about fraternities and sororities
Films about weddings
Fox network original films
Revenge Of The Nerds 4
Television sequel films
1990s English-language films